Səlahət Nüsrət oğlu Ağayev (born 4 January 1991) is an Azerbaijani professional footballer who plays for Gabala as a goalkeeper.

Career
Born in Füzuli, Ağayev has played club football for Inter Baku, MOIK Baku and Sumgayit.

On 13 January 2016, Ağayev signed with Sumgayit.

On 1 June 2019, Ağayev signed a new two-year contract with Neftçi Baku.

On 4 June 2022, Gabala announced the signing of Ağayev on a one-year contract.

International

Ağayev made his senior international debut for Azerbaijan in 2010.

Career statistics

International

Statistics accurate as of match played 29 March 2022

References

1991 births
Living people
Azerbaijani footballers
Azerbaijan international footballers
Association football goalkeepers
Shamakhi FK players
MOIK Baku players
Sumgayit FK players
Neftçi PFK players
People from Füzuli
Sabah FC (Azerbaijan) players
Gabala FC players